Izaskun Bengoa Pérez (born 14 March 1975) is a road cyclist from Spain. She represented her nation at the 1996 Summer Olympics on the road in the women's road race and on the track in the women's points race.

References

External links
 profile at sports-reference.com

Spanish female cyclists
Cyclists at the 1996 Summer Olympics
Olympic cyclists of Spain
Living people
Sportspeople from Bilbao
1975 births
Cyclists from the Basque Country (autonomous community)
20th-century Spanish women